The Alpha Phi Sorority House, located in Eugene, Oregon, is listed on the National Register of Historic Places.  It is near the University of Oregon, home to the Tau chapter of Alpha Phi.

See also
 National Register of Historic Places listings in Lane County, Oregon

References

1924 establishments in Oregon
Houses on the National Register of Historic Places in Eugene, Oregon
Fraternity and sorority houses
Sorority houses
History of women in Oregon